Lina's Wedding is a 1973 Danish-Norwegian drama film directed by Knud Leif Thomsen. It was entered into the 8th Moscow International Film Festival, where Ingerid Vardund won the award for Best Actress.

Cast
 Ingerid Vardund as Lina
 Roy Bjørnstad as Gilbert
 Rolf Søder
 Erling Andresen
 Eilif Armand
 Bente Brunvoll (voice)
 Edith Carlmar
 Per Christensen
 Vegard Hall
 Mette Lange-Nielsen
 Arne Lie

References

External links
 

1973 films
1973 drama films
Danish drama films
1970s Danish-language films
1970s Norwegian-language films
Films directed by Knud Leif Thomsen
Norwegian drama films
1973 multilingual films
Danish multilingual films
Norwegian multilingual films